James "Jim" Korthe (June 26, 1970 – January 13, 2010) was an American heavy metal musician and social worker.  He was a drummer in the 1980s thrash metal band Phantasm, and he later fronted the nu metal band 3rd Strike.

Life and musical career
Korthe grew up in San Pedro, California.  After displaying interest in music early in his life, he became involved in local bands.  In 1987, at the age of 16, he joined Phantasm.  Something of a heavy metal supergroup, the band also featured original Metallica bassist Ron McGovney, and singer Katon W. De Pena of Hirax.  Despite garnering local popularity, the band dissolved after a short career due to internal tensions stemming from age divides and alcohol abuse within the band.  (Although the band never released an album, 2001's Wreckage album repackages their demo with live tracks from 1987 recorded during Korthe's tenure with the group.)

In 1988, Korthe began the Dimestore Hoods, a group interested in both hardcore and rap musics.   In the group, Korthe acted as lead vocalist and primary songwriter.  Around this same time, Korthe also became heavily involved in Southern California gang culture, leading to problems with drugs and the law. After spending several years deeply embroiled in "street" culture, Korthe made a conscious decision to step away from the lifestyle and focus on his music.

Dimestore Hoods released an album with MCA Records in 1995, but disagreements with the label led the band to change their name and personnel, beginning anew under the moniker 3rd Strike.  The new group also underwent several personnel shifts and withstood several breakups before releasing their first album, 2002's Lost Angel, released on Hollywood Records.  The band toured with the Warped Tour and Ozzfest touring circuits in support of their dark and multi-disciplinary brand of heavy metal before disbanding in 2004.  In 2007, they reformed and began work on new material, but a second record never materialized.

On January 13, 2010, Korthe was found dead in his home of natural causes.  He was 39.

References

External links
Phantasm at the Encyclopedia Metallum
3rd Strike at MySpace

American rock singers
American heavy metal drummers
Nu metal singers
Singers from California
1970 births
2010 deaths
People from San Pedro, Los Angeles
Phantasm (band) members